King Edward VI College can refer to:

 King Edward VI College, Nuneaton
 King Edward VI College, Stourbridge